Ablon-sur-Seine (literally Ablon on Seine) is a commune in the Val-de-Marne department in the southeastern suburbs of Paris, France.

Ablon has been awarded one flower in the Concours des villes et villages fleuris ("towns and villages in bloom competition").

Geography

As it is an urban commune there are numerous roads in the commune with the most important being the D266 going north to the Centre de Finances Publiques and the D29 / D246 / D2498 which run west to east along the south of the commune parallel with the Seine. 

The main railway from the Gare d'Austerlitz to Bordeaux runs south-west through the commune, and Ablon station is served by regional express trains on (RER) Line C.

The Seine river forms the whole southern border of the commune. The whole of the western border and the Seine are also the border between the Val-de-Marne and Essonne departments. There is no bridge from the commune across the Seine.

History

Henri IV, by the Edict of Nantes in March 1598, allowed Protestants to practice their faith outside the walls of Paris. He authorized the construction of a Protestant church at Ablons.

There was a castle built in Ablon by Agnes Sorel and a Protestant church which was frequented until the revocation of the Edict of Nantes by the Reformed Parisians.

The economic activity Ablon has always been linked to the river but a cropping part of its economy was favoured by its loamy soils. It has been traditionally a residential commune, with the urban area mainly residential.

Heraldry

Administration
List of Successive Mayors of Ablon-sur-Seine

Mayors from 1941

Twinning

Ablon-sur-Seine has twinning associations with:
 Penkridge (United Kingdom) since 1986 
 Neubiberg (Germany) since 1975.

Population
The inhabitants of the commune are known as Ablonais or Ablonaises in French.

Culture and heritage

Civil heritage
The commune has many buildings and structures that are registered as historical monuments:

A House at 16 Rue du Bac (19th century)
A House at 16ter Rue du Bac (19th century)
A House at 33bis Rue du Bac (19th century)
The Station Cafe-Restaurant at 37 Rue du Bac (19th century)
A Building at 42 Rue du Bac (19th century)
The Boulangerie Pelloile at 35 Quai de la Baronne (19th century)

A Building at 3 Place Chollet (1896)
The Château Corpet at Sentier de la Courre aux Lièvres (1884)
A House at 15 Rue Edouard Juvigny (19th century)
A Château at 5 Rue de l'Eglise (1348)
The Château Magne at Rue d'Estienne d'Orves (1856)
A Railway Station at Rue Gabriel Péri (20th century)
The War Memorial at Rue du Général de Gaulle (1922)
A Cafe-Restaurant at 10 Rue du Général de Gaulle (19th century)
A House at 15 Place Henri Duru (1893)
A Railway Station at Place de la Libération (19th century)
A Weir with Lock at Quai Magné (1863)
The Town Hall / Groupe Scolaire Pasteur School at 17 Rue du Maréchal Foch (1883)
Twinned Houses at 25-27 Rue Simon (19th century)
The Pont du Diable (Devil's Bridge) at Route de Villeneuve (20th century)
Houses and Buildings (19th-20th centuries)
A House (20th century)
Ancient Town Remains (12th-20th centuries)

Religious heritage
The Parish Church of Our Lady of the Assumption (1842) is registered as an historical monument. The Church contains many items that are registered as historical objects:

A Painting: Christ before the Sanhedrin (16th century)
A Tombstone for Philippe de Douzonville (1458)
A Ciborium (19th century)
A Sunburst Monstrance (19th century)
A Chalice with Paten (20th century)
A Chalice with Paten (1) (19th century)
A Painting: Descent from the Cross (19th century)
A Painting: Saint Geneviève (18th century)
A Painting: Jesus before the Sanhedrin (17th century)
A Baptismal font (18th century)
A Tombstone (15th century)

Education
Public schools:
 Preschools: Ecole maternelle Marie Curie and Ecole maternelle Saint-Exupéry
 Elementary schools: Ecoles élémentaire Louis Pasteur A and Ecoles élémentaire Louis Pasteur B

Students in this commune are served by Collège Jean Macé (junior high school) and Collège / Lycée Georges Brassens (junior and senior high school), both in Villeneuve-le-Roi.

There is one private school called Sacré-Cœur (Sacred Heart), which serves preschool through junior high school.

Cultural events and festivals
From 2001 to 2008, Ablon has organised various cultural events. An independent association, It was once Ablon, organised these events to enable people to experience the history of the town and its inhabitants arouse a community spirit in Ablon people. Some events have left their mark on the town including the grand historical rally with themes such as "Discovering neighbourhoods", "the old trades of Ablon", "a Castle Mystery", etc..

Other cultural activities include the festival "Your Neighbours Have Talent", which hosted painters, sculptors, photographers, and musicians from the region. This festival also hosted young artists from the National Conservatory of Paris, artists, and recent graduates from fine art schools.

Another event highly appreciated by all generations of the city was cyber-Ablon, organized over a whole weekend. This event allowed the even the oldest people to learn office skills such as Internet browsing, email, Word, Excel etc. and for younger ones to come together for network games.

For 8 March, the association proposed an event to mark the International Day of Women's Rights (films, exhibition of paintings and photographs, conferences etc.). The municipal council took this activity under consideration.

Dormant since 2008, the life of the association has been suspended.

Picture Gallery

Notable people linked to the commune
Jacques-Antoine de Chambarlhac de Laubespin, born at Les Estables 2 August 1754, died in Paris 23 February 1826, a General of the Empire
Claudine Guérin de Tencin (1682-1749) owned a house in Ablon where she loved to come on holiday
Alain Poher (1909-1996), former president of the Senate, born in Ablon he was Mayor from 1946 to 1983

See also
Communes of the Val-de-Marne department

References

External links
Ablon-sur-Seine official website 
Ablon-sur-Seine on Géoportail, National Geographic Institute (IGN) website 
Ablon on the 1750 Cassini Map

Communes of Val-de-Marne